The Al-Muhamashīn, "the marginalized ones"); previously called The Al-Akhdām, Akhdām or Achdām ("the servants", singular Khadem, meaning "servant" in Arabic, are an Arabic-speaking ethnic group who live in Yemen. Although the Muhamashīn are Arabic-speaking Muslims just like most other Yemenis, they are considered to be at the very bottom of the supposedly abolished caste ladder, are socially segregated and are mostly confined to menial jobs in the country's major cities. According to official estimates, the Muhamashīn numbered between 500,000 and 3,500,000 individuals.

Origins 

The exact origins of Al-Akhdam are uncertain. One popular belief holds that they are descendants of Nilotic Sudanese people who accompanied the Aksumite army during the latter's occupation of Yemen in the pre-Islamic period. Once the Abyssinian troops were finally expelled at the start of the Muslim era, some of the Sudanese migrants are said to have remained behind, giving birth to the Akhdam people. This belief, however, was denied and described as a myth by Hamud al-Awdi, a professor of sociology at Sana'a University.

Societal discrimination in Yemen 
Anthropologists such as Vombruck postulate that Yemen's history and social hierarchy that developed under various regimes, including the Zaydi Imamate, had created a hereditary caste-like society. Today, the Al-Akhdam people still exist at the very bottom of Yemeni social strata.

In the mid-20th century, the Akhdam people who lived in the vicinity of al-Gades (an exclusive Jewish village) were given the name "Kano" by Jews. While a Shafi'i Lowland Muslim would eat from the same dish as a Jew, he would break a vessel touched by one of the Akhdam. Jewish women, however, would still sing the songs of Ahkhdam women, who were often hired as farmhands.

Social conditions 
The Al-Akhdam community suffers from extreme discrimination, persecution, and social exclusion from the mainstream Yemeni society. The contempt for the Akhdam people is expressed by a traditional Yemeni proverb: "Clean your plate if it is touched by a dog, but break it if it's touched by a Khadem.″Though their social conditions have improved somewhat in modern times, Al-Akhdam are still stereotyped by mainstream Yemeni society; they have been called lowly, dirty and immoral. Intermarriages between the conventional Yemeni society with the Akhdam community are taboo and virtually prohibited, as the Al-Akhdam are deemed as untouchables. Men who do marry into the community risk banishment by their families.

Today, in Yemen, children born from mixed Akhdam and Yemeni parentage are called muwāldedīn, and are often still discriminated against in their society. 

The social inequality of the Al-Akhdam is also analysed by Anne Meneley from a gendered perspective. Indeed, in Yemeni society, women have a certain number of practices to respect in order to be considered pious in the eyes of society. These practices are, among others, a certain behavior to be respected such as wearing the veil or a way of socializing and maintaining relationships. Women from the elite are linked to power and contribute to reproducing the relations of dominance that are exercised towards the Akhdams. In the eyes of the elite, Akhdam women are not respectable because they do not have acceptable moral behavior. They do not wear chador but, instead, they wear colorful gowns with wide sleeves and they go to the suq to sell goods even though the suq is supposed to be a place for men only. All these inappropriate behaviors, according to the dominant class, accentuate the domination of this class by opposing the respectable and pious elite and the Akhdams women who do not wear the veil and are morally inferior.

Economic status 
In the face of extreme societal discrimination, the Al-Akhdam people are forced to work menial and dirty jobs such as sweeping, shoe-making and the cleaning of latrines, vocations for which they are still known to this day. Those who are unemployed, most of whom are women, usually resort to begging.

Even the Akhdam people who are employed are not spared from discrimination. Akhdam street sweepers are rarely granted contracts even after decades of work, despite the fact that all Yemeni civil servants are supposed to be granted contracts after six months. They receive no benefits, and almost no time off.

The Akhdam reside in slum districts that are generally isolated from the rest of Yemeni society. It is hardly possible for the Akhdam people to afford shelter with even the most basic amenities such as electricity, running water and sewage system.  Accordingly, Akhdam generally live in small huts haphazardly built of wood and cloth.

Health conditions 
Due to poverty and the unsanitary living conditions, the Akhdam people are vulnerable to preventable diseases. The death rates from preventable diseases are worse than the nationwide average in Yemen. Many Al-Akhdam children suffer from diseases such as dyspnoea, malaria and polio, and the death rate is high. The reported infant mortality rate is also described as "appalling". Out of the deaths reported in an Akhdam shantytown over a year, about a half were children under the age of 5, a quarter of whom were in the first month of life.

Studies by Al-Serouri et al. further report a poorer understanding of HIV risks amongst the Al-Akhdam community. Accordingly, group members also have higher reported rates and risks of contracting HIV infections.

Activism and international visibility 
Many NGOs and charitable organizations from other countries such as CARE International are reportedly working toward improving the living circumstances of the Akhdam. Such initiatives include the building of a chicken farm, sanitation projects, the provision of electricity and classes aimed at eradicating illiteracy. The extent of these efforts, however, is disputed, most notably by Huda Sief. Government corruption also means that monetary aid intended for the Akhdam is often misused or stolen.

Government officials, while admitting a historical disdain for the Akhdam among conventional Yemeni society, insist that there is no official discrimination. The Yemeni government has occasionally built shelters for the Akhdam, although it is reported that 30% of Akhdam who received such state housing sold it, choosing instead to return to their original neighborhoods. Despite the supposed absence of official discrimination, many Akhdam claim that officials often block their attempts to seek state services at schools and hospitals.

The search for rights and recognition is a daily task for the Akhdams. This daily struggle for survival further reinforces the stereotypes that other social classes have about the Akhdam community. To change this, many petitions and letters are being written asking the state for welfare and other assistance. This way of negotiating without violence and insurgency is due to the fact that the Akhdam community does not take the state as the enemy but as the one that has to defend the weakest citizens. These requests and petitions rarely succeed.

A significant step forward was achieved with the formation of a political party to represent them and possibly alleviate their conditions. The Yemeni revolt in 2011 had also roused many Akhdam people to participate in the uprising by appearing regularly in the demonstrations and sit-ins that filled the mains squares of the capital city Sanaa and Taiz. This popular uprising was taking place that called for egalitarian citizenship and recognition of the diversity of identities within Yemeni society. By egalitarian citizenship, the Yemeni people mean that every Yemeni on the street is equal. This uprising led to a transition period, running from March 2012 to February 2014, which was supposed to lead to a new, more cohesive Yemen. Many had hoped that the revolt would help end the cycle of racism that has placed them at the bottom of the social ladder.

Stereotypes and global discource on race 
The Akhdams are associated with a number of stereotypes. They are considered immoral because they let their wives interact with men, ignorant of the Islamic religion, lenient towards theft and alcohol, or they are nomads without any property. 

The emergence of the notion of race and racism in contemporary Yemen is linked to the emergence of the European racial configuration in the 1930s and then in Egypt following the revolution of 1952. In the Middle East, it is the "unsuriyya" term that will spread. The notion of “unsuriyya” or racism emerged in public discourse in Yemen in the 1950s as a critique of Hashemite privilege. Akhdams activists and politicians rely on the color of their skin to denounce the marginalization of their people. This amplifies their international visibility.

Distribution
Most Al-Akhdam live in segregated slums on the outskirts of Yemen's main urban centers. Many of them reside in the capital Sana'a. Others can also be found in Aden, Ta'izz, Lahij, Abyan, Al Hudaydah and Mukalla.

Demographics
According to official estimates, the Akhdam numbered around 500,000 individuals in 2004. An organisation called "Yemen’s Sawa’a Organisation for Anti-Discrimination" estimates put their number at over 3.5 million residents in 2013, which is 14% out of the total population of Yemen.

See also
Human rights in Yemen

References

External links
The International Dalit Solidarity Network: The Al-Akhdam in Yemen

Arab groups
Caste
Ethnic groups in Yemen
Society of Yemen
Muslim communities in Asia
People of African descent
Discrimination in Yemen
Ethnic groups in the Middle East